Aramaic Music Festival is the first international Aramaic music festival, which was held in the  Syriac village of Tannourine in Mount Lebanon, Lebanon, year 2008 1–4 August for the Syriac people.

Singers like Gabi Conda, Sina Marawge, Massoud Elia and Elie Gabriel attended in the festival.

See also
Syriac Music
Syriacs
Arameans

References 

Assyrian music
Indigenous music festivals
Music festivals in Lebanon